A molozonide (or "molecular ozonide") is a 1,2,3-trioxolane, which can also be considered a cyclic disubstituted trioxidane derivative. Molozonides are formed by cycloaddition of ozone and an alkene during ozonolysis, as a transient intermediate which quickly rearranges to give the ozonide (1,2,4-trioxolane), the relatively stable product generated immediately prior to reductive or oxidative cleavage to form alcohols, carbonyl compounds, or derivatives thereof.

References

Oxygen heterocycles
Polyoxides
Heterocyclic compounds with 1 ring